Subrata Bakshi (born 23 July 1950) is an Indian politician who currently serves as Member of Parliament, Rajya Sabha from West Bengal. He is the General Secretary of All India Trinamool Congress and State President of West Bengal Trinamool Congress. He was the Minister for Public Works and the Minister for Transport in the Government of West Bengal in 2011. He was also an MLA, elected from the Bhabanipur constituency in the 2011 West Bengal state assembly election.

He was elected to parliament from South Kolkata constituency after Mamata Banerjee resigned to become a member of the West Bengal Legislative Assembly. He was elected on 10 December 2011 with a margin of 2,30,999 votes, and re-elected in 2014.

References

	
	
	

Living people
India MPs 2009–2014
Lok Sabha members from West Bengal
Trinamool Congress politicians from West Bengal
State cabinet ministers of West Bengal
India MPs 2014–2019
1950 births
People from Kolkata district
West Bengal MLAs 2001–2006
West Bengal MLAs 2006–2011
West Bengal MLAs 2011–2016
Indian National Congress politicians from West Bengal